The Gut (also: Condratău) is a left tributary of the river Crișul Alb in Romania. It discharges into the Crișul Alb near Șicula.

References

Rivers of Romania
Rivers of Arad County